Avtokomanda is an indoor sports arena located in Skopje, North Macedonia. 

The arena is owned and used by handball clubs RK Metalurg and ŽRK Metalurg.

References

External links 
Arena Information

Indoor arenas in North Macedonia
Handball venues in North Macedonia